Bellottia is a genus of viviparous brotulas which is found in the subtropical waters of the North Atlantic, the Mediterranean Sea and the Indo-Pacific.

Species
There are currently four recognized species in this genus:
 Bellottia apoda Giglioli, 1883
 Bellottia armiger (H. M. Smith & Radcliffe, 1913)
 Bellottia galatheae J. G. Nielsen & Møller, 2008
 Bellottia robusta J. G. Nielsen, S. W. Ross & Cohen, 2009

References

Bythitidae